In his 1557 work The Whetstone of Witte, British mathematician Robert Recorde proposed an exponent notation by prime factorisation, which remained in use up until the eighteenth century and acquired the name Arabic exponent notation.  The principle of Arabic exponents was quite similar to Egyptian fractions; large exponents were broken down into smaller prime numbers.  Squares and cubes were so called; prime numbers from five onwards were called sursolids.

Although the terms used for defining exponents differed between authors and times, the general system was the primary exponent notation until René Descartes devised the Cartesian exponent notation, which is still used today.

This is a list of Recorde's terms.

By comparison, here is a table of prime factors:

See also 
 Surd

External links (references) 
 Mathematical dictionary, Chas Hutton, pg 224

Mathematical notation